Basil Leonard Plumley (January 1, 1920 – October 10, 2012) was a career soldier and airborne combat infantryman in the United States Army who rose to the rank of command sergeant major. As a combat veteran of World War II and the Vietnam War, he is most noted for his actions during the Battle of Ia Drang in Vietnam.

Military career
Plumley enlisted in the United States Army as a private on March 31, 1942.  He was a gliderman of the 320th Glider Field Artillery Battalion, 82nd Airborne Division. He saw action during the Invasion of Normandy and Operation Market Garden. 

Plumley participated in two glider assaults in the European Theater. His first was on June 6, 1944, during the Invasion of Normandy, and his second was for Operation Market Garden on Sept. 18, 1944. Plumley was shot in the hand the same day for which he received the Purple Heart and was awarded multiple decorations for his service in World War II. 

Basil Plumley was stationed from 1950 through 1953 at Fort Campbell, Kentucky.

He fought in Vietnam with the 1st Battalion, 7th Cavalry Regiment. He participated in the Battle of Ia Drang in Vietnam in 1965, under the command of Lieutenant Colonel Hal Moore, who praised Plumley as an outstanding NCO and leader in the 1992 book about this battle, We Were Soldiers Once… and Young. The book was the basis for the 2002 film We Were Soldiers, in which Plumley was played by actor Sam Elliott. Plumley was known affectionately by his soldiers as "Old Iron Jaw". 
Command Sergeant Major Basil Plumley served in the Republic of Korea between 1972 and 1973.

He retired as a command sergeant major on December 31, 1974, having been awarded 28 different personal, unit, campaign and service awards and decorations in almost 33 years of military service, spanning World War II and the Vietnam War. After his retirement, he worked 15 more years for the army as a civilian in administration at Martin Army Community Hospital and at various medical clinics around Fort Benning, Georgia, retiring again in 1990.

Personal life
Plumley was born on January 1, 1920, in Shady Spring, West Virginia, the second son and fifth child of coal miner Clay H. Plumley (September 19, 1882 – 26 February 1952) and his wife Georgia B. Morton (January 19, 1895 – February 16, 1962), both of whom were natives of West Virginia. After two years of high-school, he worked as a chauffeur/driver before enlisting in the US Army on March 31, 1942.  In 1949, Plumley married Deurice Dillon (September 26, 1923 – May 28, 2012), who died on May 28, 2012, after 63 years of marriage. Plumley died of cancer after nine days in Columbus Hospice (Columbus, Georgia), on October 10, 2012. He is survived by his daughter, Debbie Kimble, a granddaughter, and two great-grandchildren.

In popular culture
Plumley was a prominent and central figure in the 1992 book We Were Soldiers Once… and Young by Lt. Gen Hal Moore and Joseph L. Galloway about the Battle of Ia Drang and was portrayed by actor Sam Elliott in the 2002 film adaption.

Awards and decorations
There have been disputes about the medals and decorations Plumley was entitled to wear. Brian Siddall, an independent researcher, alleged in 2015 that Plumley wore unauthorized combat and valor awards that exaggerated his wartime achievements. The U.S. Army has stated that there is no evidence of a substantial error in the recording of Plumley's decorations and has noted that the personnel records of the army are not uncommonly in error, especially during war time and prior to digital filing.

Awards and decorations (Army memo from 2015)

CSM Plumley also received 3 fourragères: World War II War Cross from France and Belgium as well as the Orange Lanyard from The Netherlands.

References

1920 and 1930 US census for Raleigh County, West Virginia
US Army enlistment records of World War II
7th U.S. Cavalry Regiment Association

1920 births
2012 deaths
Deaths from cancer in Georgia (U.S. state)
United States Army soldiers
United States Army personnel of World War II
United States Army personnel of the Vietnam War
Recipients of the Silver Star
Recipients of the Legion of Merit
Recipients of the Air Medal
Recipients of the Gallantry Cross (Vietnam)
Recipients of the Croix de guerre (Belgium)
Recipients of the Croix de Guerre 1939–1945 (France)
Recipients of the Order of Saint Maurice
Battle of Ia Drang
United States Army personnel of the Korean War
People from Raleigh County, West Virginia
Military personnel from West Virginia